Księżpol  is a village in Biłgoraj County, Lublin Voivodeship, in eastern Poland. It is the seat of the gmina (administrative district) called Gmina Księżpol.

The village has a population of 1,145.

References

Villages in Biłgoraj County
Kholm Governorate